Friedrich Rudolf Klein (24 November 1885 – 29 May 1955), better known as Rudolf Klein-Rogge, was a German film actor, best known for playing sinister figures in films in the 1920s and 1930s as well as being a mainstay in director Fritz Lang's Weimar-era films. He is probably best known in popular culture, particularly to English-speaking audiences, for playing the archetypal mad scientist role of C. A. Rotwang in Lang's Metropolis and as the criminal genius Doctor Mabuse.  Klein-Rogge also appeared in several important French films in the late 1920s and early 1930s.

Biography
Friedrich Rudolf Klein was born in Cologne, Germany on 24 November 1885. His mother, Maria Bertha Emma Rose, was the daughter of a prominent landowner in Lichteinen, East Prussia.

The elder Klein hoped his son would follow him into a military career and entered him in one of the elite Prussian cadet academies (possibly nearby Bensberg). These institutions were famous for their harsh discipline and dedication to Spartan ideals; many of Germany's most renowned 19th and 20th century military leaders attended such schools. On his deathbed, however, Klein-Rogge confided to a friend that when a teacher went after him he ran away from school.

His father's premature death in 1896 ended Klein-Rogge's tenure at the cadet school and he entered a local humanistic gymnasium in Cologne. One of his childhood friends was future film composer Gottfried Huppertz, who was to write the scores for Lang's Die Nibelungen as well as Metropolis. Huppertz dedicated his first composition,  ["Climbing Roses"], to Klein-Rogge.) It was likely the actor who introduced his old friend to Lang.

Klein-Rogge spent three years at the University of Bonn (then Rhein-Universität) and in Berlin, studying art history. He also began taking acting lessons from Hans Siebert, a veteran of Vienna's Burgtheater, and made his stage debut in 1909, playing Cassius in Julius Caesar in Halberstadt. As there was a contemporary actor named Rudolf Klein, the future film star added "Rogge" to his name. (Rogge was the surname of his mother's first husband and his half-siblings.)

After his debut, Klein-Rogge went on to play in theaters located in Düsseldorf, Kiel and Aachen. In Aachen, Klein-Rogge wed actress Gerda Melchior, a cousin of the beloved silent film star Henny Porten, but the marriage ended when he met actress and novelist Thea von Harbou. The two married in 1914 and the following year, Klein-Rogge joined Nuremberg's Städtische Bühnen theatre as both an actor and director. In 1918, the pair moved to Berlin to capitalize on von Harbou's writing skills and her budding career as a scenarist and screenwriter, while Klein-Rogge was hired by Victor Barnowsky, director of Berlin's Lessing Theater.

Klein-Rogge's film career began in earnest in 1919, although he may have made an uncredited screen debut in 1913's Der Film von der Königin Luise, directed by Franz Porten. It has been more widely stated that he appeared in an uncredited role of a criminal in The Cabinet of Dr. Caligari. However, recent research has found that the part was actually played by Ludwig Rex. The confusion may have stemmed from Klein-Rogge's skill in disguising his appearance with theatrical makeup, wigs and prosthetics, which has led at least one movie historian to dub him Germany's Lon Chaney.

At this time, von Harbou was having an affair with director Fritz Lang and eventually left Klein-Rogge to marry Lang. Despite the split, Klein-Rogge made several films that were written by von Harbou and directed by Lang, including Destiny, Dr. Mabuse the Gambler, Die Nibelungen, Metropolis and Spies. Klein-Rogge's intense look led him to similar roles such as a tyrant in Fritz Wendhausen's Der steinerne Reiter, a pirate in Arthur Robison's Pietro der Korsar, and the Czar in Alexandre Volkoff's Casanova. Klein-Rogge's last film with Lang was The Testament of Dr. Mabuse in 1933.

Klein-Rogge played the lead roles in two films written and directed by von Harbou: Elisabeth und der Narr and Hanneles Himmelfahrt. Klein-Rogge remarried twice, first to Margarete Neff, and lastly with the Swedish actress Mary Johnson in 1932, to whom he remained married until his death in 1955.

Selected filmography

 Das Licht am Fenster (1919)
 Spiele eines Milliardärs (1919)
 Das Geheimnis des Irren (1919)
 Morphium (1919)
 Flitter-Dörtje (1919)
 Die Launen eines Milliardärs (1919)
 Der Fall Tolstikoff (1919) - Ernst Rüdiger
 Die Schreckensnacht im Irrenhaus Ivoy (1920) - Dr. Harry Walker
Wildes Blut (1920)
The Black Count (1920)
The Wandering Image (1920) - Georgs Vetter Wil Brand
Four Around a Woman (1921) - Hehler Upton
The Nights of Cornelis Brouwer (1921)
Am Webstuhl der Zeit (1921)
Destiny (1921) - Derwisch / Girolamo
Circus of Life (1921) - Chauffeur Tom
Dr. Mabuse the Gambler (1922) - Dr. Mabuse
The Stone Rider (1923) - Der Herr vom Berge
Princess Suwarin (1923) - Cyrus Proctor
Warning Shadows (1923)
Die Nibelungen (1924) - King Etzel
Peter the Pirate (1925) - Salvatore, ein Korsarhauptmann
Her Husband's Wife (1926)
The Pink Diamond (1926) - Stuart, Theaterdirektor
Fadette (1926) - Rossini
Fighting the White Slave Traffic (1926) - Akkunian
White Slave Traffic (1926) - Simpat Karamanian / Arut Akkunian / ein deutscher Professor / ein asiatischer Hausierer / Dr. Papamarkos
Metropolis (1927) - Erfinder C.A. Rotwang / The Inventor
The Gypsy Baron (1927) - Mehmed Ali
Der Herr der Nacht (1927) - Eugen Lascano
The Queen Was in the Parlour (1927) - General Kish
The Loves of Casanova (1927) - Le Tsar Peter III
Tingel-Tangel (1927) - Don Fabio Coridon
Die raffinierteste Frau Berlins (1927) - William Pitts alias Francis Forest
The Girl from Frisco (1927)
Die Sandgräfin (1928)
Spies (1928) - Haghi
Mädchenschicksale (1928) - Lormand
Volga Volga (1928) - Kosak Hadschi-Ali
The Most Beautiful Woman in Paris (1928)
La faute de Monique (1928)
Eine Nacht in Yoshiwara (1928)
Tu m'appartiens! (1929) - Burat-Laussade
La maison des hommes vivants (1929)
The Shark (1930) - Vasseur
Tarakanova (1930) - Le Comte Chouvalof
Eskimo (1930) - Mariak
The White God (1932) - Mariak
The Testament of Dr. Mabuse (1933) - Docteur Mabuse
The Judas of Tyrol (1933) - Erster Offizier
 Elisabeth and the Fool (1934) - Michele
The World Without a Mask (1934) - Merker
Hanneles Himmelfahrt (1934) - Maurer Mattern
Border Patrol (1934) - Der Einäugige - ein Schmuggler
Paganini (1934) - Graf Hédouville / Kurier Napoleons
 Between Heaven and Earth (1934) - Der alte Nettenmaier
 The Brenken Case (1934) - Bert Benson, Artist
The Tannhof Women (1934) - Jakob Aigner, der Tannenhofbauer
The Old and the Young King (1935) - Leopold Dessauer
The Cossack and the Nightingale (1935) - Dschahid-Bey, Tabakgroßhändler
Das Einmaleins der Liebe (1935)
 The Valley of Love (1935) - Herr von Roden
Ein seltsamer Gast (1936) - Polizeipräfekt
The Hour of Temptation (1936) - Kriminalrat Brandt
Der Kaiser von Kalifornien (1936) - Bankier
Moral (1936) - Polizeipräsident von Simbach
Die un-erhörte Frau (1936) - Professor der Nervenklinik
 (1936) - Ponbiquet
The Court Concert (1936) - Oberst Flumms
Truxa (1937) - Varieté-Direktor
 The Ruler (1937) - Direktor Bodlfing
The Divine Jetta (1937) - Stadtrat Müller
Madame Bovary (1937) - Prof. Canivet
Strife Over the Boy Jo (1937) -  Der Deutsche Gesandte
The Yellow Flag (1937) - Kapitän Ellis
Der Katzensteg (1937) - Landrat Krotkeim
Abenteuer in Marokko (1938) - Dr. Linder
Ab Mitternacht (1938)
Zwei Frauen (1938)
Sergeant Berry (1938)
Menschen vom Varieté (1939) - Kommissar Wiedemann
Parkstrasse 13 (1939) - Direktor Bremer
Wibbel the Tailor (1939) - Pangdich
Robert Koch (1939) - Rechnungsrat
Kennwort Machin (1939) - Schnellrichter in New York
Rheinische Brautfahrt (1939) - Landrat
Die unvollkommene Liebe (1940) - Konsul Henry Rasmus
Das Herz der Königin (1940) - General Ruthven
Kora Terry (1940) - Dunkler Ehrenmann, Komplize Vopescus
Wedding in Barenhof (1942) - Sanitätsrat
 (1949) - (final film role)

Notes

References

External links

The Official Rudolf Klein-Rogge Page (Germany)
Rudolf Klein-Rogge
Photographs of Rudolf Klein-Rogge

1885 births
1955 deaths
German male film actors
German male silent film actors
Actors from Cologne
People from the Rhine Province
20th-century German male actors